The Temple of Joy Kali in Dhaka, Bangladesh, is situated between Thathari Bazar and Wari, on a road itself named after this temple, at 24 Joy Kali Temple street. Joy Kali Temple is a Hindu temple devoted to Goddess Kali Ma. People of Hindu religion of every age come to this temple to worship Goddess Kali. The statue of Goddess Kali is of great significance to the Hindus. The visitors and committee members of this temple gather money for occasions, where sweets are later distributed among them which is called 'Prasad'.

History

This temple is about 400 years old, established in the Bengali year 1001. During the reign of the Nawabs, Dewan of Nawabs Tulsi Narayan Ghosh and Nabh Narayan Ghosh established this temple with the inspection of Bancharam Saint. At that time they established twenty-one statues of Shib, Kali, Lakshminarayan, three Shalgram Chakra, Bandurga  etc. A few beautiful monuments like Pancharatna, Nabratna, temple of Shiv, guest house, were built in the house of Joy Kali. Even market named Nawabpur Joy Kali bazar, and a market situated at the south of Kaliganj hut was dedicated to Joy Kali Devi. The temple might be divided into 3 linear space with thick walls and columns which were made of terracotta with reflected gods history. All space were mainly open for focusing god's place which is garbha ghriha. Moreover, shikhara also have terracotta art which also consider about different gods activities.

Present condition

The temple is  now approximately 300.64 m2. The first priest of this Joy Kali Temple was Bancharam Saint, the third priest was Panachenand, who suffered a decline. The responsibility to serve the Devi and the temple was done through lineage. The Brahmin priests were Ram Jagannath Chakraborty, Krishna Chandra Chakraborty, Abonimohan Chraborty. The last priest in this lineage was Khitish Chandra Chakraborty, who died in 1977 due to cancer. Starting from that time the temple started to erode, due to lack of maintenance and shortage of money. This temple was damaged during the strike of 1990's. The temple was renovated later on by Goddess Kali's followers. Now the temple is much smaller than it was when it was first established. The temple was burgled and valuables looted by thieves in 2010.

Architectural significance

Inside the boundary of this temple there is basically two temples. One of the temples is of Kali Devi, the other one, which has a dome, is of Shiv. The dome is made out of plaster and is visible from outside. Locals of that area refer to this dome as the Joy Kali Temple. The front of the temple complex is a busy stop for human haulers that go into old Dhaka. The temple has tiles on the walls all around, and the floor is made out of mosaic. There are pictures of Hindu Gods and Goddesses printed on the tiled walls of the temple. The entrance to the temple is welcomed by a logo made of stainless steel saying 'Om'- which is a Hindu divine symbol. In front of the Kali Devi statue is a bell hanging from above, it is a ritual to ring the bell after entering the temple and before leaving. Joy kali temple might be a  square shaped structure with columns which are  heavy thick material and also a thick boarder in lower part of column. For this reason it might be strong and have its structure now after 400 years and also have its one shikhara. One of the temples is of kali devi, the other one, which has a shikhara, is of shiv. Basically the temples were built with general form like there is 2 garbha griha for 2 gods one is on north side another is on east side, and antarala which is can be similar with typical of north Indian temple, then mandapa, and ardho mandapa after entrance for worshipers. And the upper walls are arched shaped. The south side have on main entrance on its right side there is a place for holy basil.

References

 
 

Hindu temples in Dhaka